Ilkino is a rural locality (a village) in Gorkinskoye Rural Settlement, Kirzhachsky District, Vladimir Oblast, Russia. The population was 308 as of 2010. There are 5 streets.

Geography 
Ilkino is located on the Kirzhach River, 9 km north of Kirzhach (the district's administrative centre) by road. Lisitsyno is the nearest rural locality.

References 

Rural localities in Kirzhachsky District